Darb-e Ziarat-e Cheshmeh (also Romanized as Darb-e Zīārat-e Cheshmeh; also known as Darb-e Zīārat, Darb Zīārat, and Darb Zīyārat) is a village in Garmsar Rural District, Jebalbarez-e Jonubi District, Anbarabad County, Kerman Province, Iran. At the 2006 census, its population was 158, in 31 families.

References 

Populated places in Anbarabad County